Stephen John Davies may refer to:
 Stephen Davies (field hockey) (born 1969), Australian hockey player
 Stephen Davies (philosopher), professor at the University of Auckland